List of geographical designations for spirit drinks in the European Union

The geographical designations which may be applied to spirits are defined in Regulation (EC) No 110/2008 on the definition, description, presentation, labelling and the protection of geographical indications of spirit drinks, which repealed the earlier Regulation (EEC) 1576/89. From June 2019, the provisions of Regulation (EC) No 110/2008 have been replaced by Regulation (EU) 2019/787, with the remainder of the 2019 Regulations coming into force in May 2021.

Designations marked with an asterisk may be associated with qualifying phrases: see articles for more details.

Rum

Whisky

Grain spirit

Wine spirit

Brandy

Grape marc spirit

Fruit spirit

Cider spirit and perry spirit

Vodka

Geist

Gentian

Juniper-flavoured spirit drinks

Akvavit/aquavit

Aniseed-flavoured spirit drinks

Flavoured vodka

Liqueur

Crème de Cassis

Sloe-aromatised spirit drink or Pacharán

Maraschino/Marrasquino/Maraskino

Nocino

Bitter-tasting spirit drinks

Fruit spirit drinks

Other spirit drinks

See also
 Protected geographical indication
 Traditional food

References 

Intellectual property law of the European Union
Alcohol in Europe